This article provides information on candidates who stood for the 1993 Australian federal election. The election was held on 13 March 1993.

Redistributions and seat changes
Redistributions of electoral boundaries occurred in New South Wales, Queensland and South Australia.
In New South Wales, the National-held seat of Riverina-Darling was renamed Riverina, and the Labor-held seat of St George was renamed Watson. The Liberal-held seat of Dundas and the Labor-held seat of Phillip were abolished. The notionally Labor seat of Paterson was created.
The member for Dundas, Philip Ruddock (Liberal), contested Berowra.
The member for Grayndler, Leo McLeay (Labor), contested Watson.
The member for Macarthur, Stephen Martin (Labor), contested Cunningham.
The member for Phillip, Jeannette McHugh (Labor), contested Grayndler.
The member for Riverina-Darling, Noel Hicks (National), contested Riverina.
In Queensland, the notionally Labor seat of Dickson was created. The Labor-held seat of Fisher became notionally Liberal.
The member for Fisher, Michael Lavarch (Labor), contested Dickson.
In South Australia, the Liberal-held seat of Hawker was abolished.
The member for Hawker, Chris Gallus (Liberal), contested Hindmarsh.

Retiring Members and Senators

Labor
 Ric Charlesworth MP (Perth, WA)
 Elaine Darling MP (Lilley, Qld)
 Stephen Dubois MP (St George, NSW)
 John Gayler MP (Leichhardt, Qld)
 Gerry Hand MP (Melbourne, Vic)
 Lloyd O'Neil MP (Grey, SA)
 Gordon Scholes MP (Corio, Vic)
 John Scott MP (Hindmarsh, SA)
 Stewart West MP (Cunningham, NSW)
Senator John Button (Vic)
Senator Patricia Giles (WA)
Senator Peter Walsh (WA)

Liberal
 Max Burr MP (Lyons, Tas)
 Ewen Cameron MP (Indi, Vic)
 Fred Chaney MP (Pearce, WA)
 Harry Edwards MP (Berowra, NSW)
 Wal Fife MP (Hume, NSW)
 Bruce Goodluck MP (Franklin, Tas)
 Peter Shack MP (Tangney, WA)
 Ian Wilson MP (Sturt, SA)
Senator Peter Durack (WA)
Senator Austin Lewis (Vic)
Senator Shirley Walters (Tas)

National
 Bruce Cowan MP (Lyne, NSW)
 Peter Fisher MP (Mallee, Vic)
Senator Florence Bjelke-Petersen (Qld)

House of Representatives
Sitting members at the time of the election are shown in bold text. Successful candidates are highlighted in the relevant colour. Where there is possible confusion, an asterisk (*) is also used.

Australian Capital Territory

New South Wales

Northern Territory

Queensland

South Australia

Tasmania

Victoria

Western Australia

Senate
Sitting Senators are shown in bold text. Tickets that elected at least one Senator are highlighted in the relevant colour. Successful candidates are identified by an asterisk (*).

Australian Capital Territory
Two seats were up for election. The Labor Party was defending one seat. The Liberal Party was defending one seat.

New South Wales
Six seats were up for election. The Labor Party was defending three seats. The Liberal-National Coalition was defending two seats. The Australian Democrats were defending one seat. Senators Bronwyn Bishop (Liberal), Vicki Bourne (Democrats), David Brownhill (National), Bruce Childs (Labor), Stephen Loosley (Labor) and Sue West (Labor) were not up for re-election.

Northern Territory
Two seats were up for election. The Labor Party was defending one seat. The Country Liberal Party was defending one seat.

Queensland
Six seats were up for election. The Labor Party was defending two seats. The Liberal Party was defending two seats. The National Party was defending two seats. Senators Ron Boswell (National), Bryant Burns (Labor), John Herron (Liberal), Gerry Jones (Labor), Cheryl Kernot (Democrats) and Ian Macdonald (Liberal) were not up for re-election.

South Australia
Six seats were up for election. The Labor Party was defending three seats. The Liberal Party was defending two seats. The Australian Democrats were defending one seat. Senators Grant Chapman (Liberal), John Coulter (Democrats), Rosemary Crowley (Labor), Robert Hill (Liberal), Chris Schacht (Labor) and Baden Teague (Liberal) were not up for re-election.

Tasmania
Six seats were up for election. The Labor Party was defending three seats. The Liberal Party was defending two seats. Independent Senator Brian Harradine was defending one seat. Senators Robert Bell (Democrats), Paul Calvert (Liberal), John Devereux (Labor), Jocelyn Newman (Liberal), Nick Sherry (Labor) and John Watson (Liberal) were not up for re-election.

Victoria
Six seats were up for election. The Labor Party was defending three seats. The Liberal-National Coalition was defending two seats. The Australian Democrats were defending one seat. Senators Richard Alston (Liberal), Barney Cooney (Labor), Rod Kemp (Liberal), Kay Patterson (Liberal), Robert Ray (Labor) and Sid Spindler (Democrats) were not up for re-election.

Western Australia
Six seats were up for election. The Labor Party was defending three seats. The Liberal Party was defending three seats. Senators Michael Beahan (Labor), Christabel Chamarette (Greens), Winston Crane (Liberal), Noel Crichton-Browne (Liberal), Jim McKiernan (Labor) and John Panizza (Liberal) were not up for re-election.

Summary by party 

Beside each party is the number of seats contested by that party in the House of Representatives for each state, as well as an indication of whether the party contested the Senate election in the respective state.

Candidates for the Dickson supplementary election are not included, although the original Dickson candidates are.

See also
 1993 Australian federal election
 Members of the Australian House of Representatives, 1990–1993
 Members of the Australian House of Representatives, 1993–1996
 Members of the Australian Senate, 1990–1993
 Members of the Australian Senate, 1993–1996
 List of political parties in Australia

References
Adam Carr's Election Archive - House of Representatives 1993
Adam Carr's Election Archive - Senate 1993

1993 in Australia
Candidates for Australian federal elections